Tarantula is the second studio album released on October 12, 2004, by Flickerstick via Idol Records.

Track listing 
All songs written by Brandin Lea and Cory Kreig.

1. "Catholic Scars and Chocolate Bars" (4:34)
2. "When You Were Young" (4:15)
3. "Teenage Dope Fiend" (2:49) (released as a single) 
4. "Bleeding" (7:33)
5. "Never Enough" (4:38)
6. "The Tourist" (3:51)
7. "Money & Dealers" (3:33)
8. "Girls & Pills" (3:03)
9. "All We Are Is Gone" (6:29)
10. "Rain" (2:47)
11. "Pistol in My Hand" (6:51)
12. "The Ones" (5:12)

References

2004 albums
Flickerstick albums